In financial accounting, a cash flow statement, also known as statement of cash flows, is a financial statement that shows how changes in balance sheet accounts and income affect cash and cash equivalents, and breaks the analysis down to operating, investing and financing activities. Essentially, the cash flow statement is concerned with the flow of cash in and out of the business. As an analytical tool, the statement of cash flows is useful in determining the short-term viability of a company, particularly its ability to pay bills. International Accounting Standard 7 (IAS 7) is the International Accounting Standard that deals with cash flow statements.

People and groups interested in cash flow statements include:
 Accounting personnel, who need to know whether the organization will be able to cover payroll and other immediate expenses
 Potential lenders or creditors, who want a clear picture of a company's ability to repay
 Potential investors, who need to judge whether the company is financially sound
 Potential employees or contractors, who need to know whether the company will be able to afford compensation
Company Directors, who are responsible for the governance of the company, and are responsible for ensuring that the company does not trade while insolvent
 Shareholders of the company.

Purpose

The cash flow statement (previously known as the flow of funds statement), shows the sources of a company's cash flow and how it was used over a specific time period. It is an important indicator of a company's financial health, because a company can report a profit on its income statement, but at the same time have insufficient cash to operate. The cash flow statement reveals the quality of a company's earnings (i.e. how much came from cash flow as opposed to accounting treatment), and the firm's capacity to pay interest and dividends.

The cash flow statement differs from the balance sheet and income statement in that it excludes non-cash transactions required by accrual basis accounting, such as depreciation, deferred income taxes, write-offs on bad debts and sales on credit where receivables have not yet been collected.

The cash flow statement is intended to: 
 provide information on a firm's liquidity, solvency and financial flexibility (the ability to change cash flows in future circumstances)
 help predict future cash flows and borrowing needs
 improve the comparability of different firms' operating performance by eliminating the effects of different accounting methods. The cash flow statement has been adopted as a standard financial statement because it eliminates allocations, which might be derived from different accounting methods, such as various timeframes for depreciating fixed assets.

History and variations
Cash basis financial statements were very common before accrual basis financial statements. The "flow of funds" statements of the past were cash flow statements.

In 1863, the Dowlais Iron Company had recovered from a business slump, but had no cash to invest for a new blast furnace, despite having made a profit. To explain why there were no funds to invest, the manager made a new financial statement that was called a comparison balance sheet, which showed that the company was holding too much inventory. This new financial statement was the genesis of the cash flow statement that is used today.

In the United States in 1973, the Financial Accounting Standards Board (FASB) defined rules that made it mandatory under Generally Accepted Accounting Principles (US GAAP) to report sources and uses of funds, but the definition of "funds" was not clear. Net working capital might be cash or might be the difference between current assets and  current liabilities. From the late 1970 to the mid-1980s, the FASB discussed the usefulness of predicting future cash flows. In 1987, FASB Statement No. 95 (FAS 95) mandated that firms provide cash flow statements. In 1992, the International Accounting Standards Board (IASB) issued
International Accounting Standard 7 (IAS 7), Cash Flow Statement, which became effective in 1994, mandating that firms provide cash flow statements.

US GAAP and IAS 7 rules for cash flow statements are similar, but some of the differences are:
 IAS 7 requires that the cash flow statement include changes in both cash and cash equivalents. US GAAP permits using cash alone or cash and cash equivalents.
 IAS 7 permits bank borrowings (overdraft) in certain countries to be included in cash equivalents rather than being considered a part of financing activities.
 IAS 7 allows interest paid to be included in operating activities or financing activities. US GAAP requires that interest paid be included in operating activities.
 US GAAP (FAS 95) requires that when the direct method is used to present the operating activities of the cash flow statement, a supplemental schedule must also present a cash flow statement using the indirect method. The International Accounting Standards Committee (IASC) strongly recommends the direct method but allows either method. The IASC considers the indirect method less clear to users of financial statements. Cash flow statements are most commonly prepared using the indirect method, which is not especially useful in projecting future cash flows.

Cash flow activities
International Accounting Standard 3 specifies the cash flows and adjustments to be included under each of the major activity categories.

Operating activities
Operating activities include the production, sales and delivery of the company's product as well as collecting payment from its customers. This could include purchasing raw materials, building inventory, advertising, and shipping the product.

Operating cash flows include:
 Receipts for the sale of loans, debt or equity instruments in a trading portfolio
 Interest received on loans
 Payments to suppliers for goods and services
 Payments to employees or on behalf of employees
 Interest payments (alternatively, this can be reported under financing activities in IAS 3)
 Purchases of merchandise 

Items which are added back to (or subtracted from, as appropriate) net income (which is found on the Income Statement) to arrive at cash flows from operations generally include:
 Depreciation (loss of tangible asset value over time)
 Deferred tax
 Amortization (loss of intangible asset value over time)
 Any gains or losses associated with the sale of a non-current asset, because associated cash flows do not belong in the operating section (unrealized gains/losses are also added back from the income statement)
Dividends received general reserves

Investing activities
Examples of investing activities are:
 Purchase or sale of an asset
 Loans made to suppliers 
 Payments related to mergers and acquisitions

Financing activities
Financing activities include inflows and outflows of cash between investors and the company, such as:
 Dividends paid
 Sale or repurchase of the company's stock
 Net borrowings
 Repayment of debt principal, including capital leases
 Other activities which impact the company's long-term liabilities and equity

Disclosure of non-cash activities
Under IAS 7, non-cash investing and financing activities are disclosed in footnotes to the financial statements. Under US General Accepted Accounting Principles (GAAP), non-cash activities may be disclosed in a footnote or within the cash flow statement itself. Non-cash financing activities may include:
 Leasing to purchase an asset
 Converting debt to equity
 Exchanging non-cash assets or liabilities for other non-cash assets or liabilities
 Issuing share
 Payment of dividend taxes in exchange for assets

Preparation methods
The direct method of preparing a cash flow statement results in a more easily understood report. The indirect method is almost universally used, because FAS 95 requires a supplementary report similar to the indirect method if a company chooses to use the direct method.

Direct method
The direct method for creating a cash flow statement reports major classes of gross cash receipts and payments. Under IAS 7, dividends received may be reported under operating activities or under investing activities. If taxes paid are directly linked to operating activities, they are reported under operating activities; if the taxes are directly linked to investing activities or financing activities, they are reported under investing or financing activities. Generally Accepted Accounting Principles (GAAP) vary from International Financial Reporting Standards in that under GAAP rules, dividends received from a company's investing activities is reported as an "operating activity," not an "investing activity."

Sample cash flow statement using the direct method

Indirect method
The indirect method uses net-income as a starting point, makes adjustments for all transactions for non-cash items, then adjusts from all cash-based transactions. An increase in an asset account is subtracted from net income, and an increase in a liability account is added back to net income. This method converts accrual-basis net income (or loss) into cash flow by using a series of additions and deductions.

Rules (operating activities)

The following rules can be followed to calculate Cash Flows from Operating Activities when given only a two-year comparative balance sheet and the Net Income figure. Cash Flows from Operating Activities can be found by adjusting Net Income relative to the change in beginning and ending balances of Current Assets, Current Liabilities, and sometimes Long Term Assets. When comparing the change in long term assets over a year, the accountant must be certain that these changes were caused entirely by their devaluation rather than purchases or sales (i.e. they must be operating items not providing or using cash) or if they are non-operating items.
Decrease in non-cash current assets are added to net income
Increase in non-cash current asset are subtracted from net income
Increase in current liabilities are added to net income
Decrease in current liabilities are subtracted from net income
Expenses with no cash outflows are added back to net income (depreciation and/or amortization expense are the only operating items that have no effect on cash flows in the period)
Revenues with no cash inflows are subtracted from net income
Non operating losses are added back to net income
Non operating gains are subtracted from net income

The intricacies of this procedure might be seen as,

For example, consider a company that has a net income of $100 this year, and its A/R increased by $25 since the beginning of the year. If the balances of all other current assets, long term assets and current liabilities did not change over the year, the cash flows could be determined by the rules above as $100 – $25 = Cash Flows from Operating Activities = $75. The logic is that, if the company made $100 that year (net income), and they are using the accrual accounting system (not cash based) then any income they generated that year which has not yet been paid for in cash should be subtracted from the net income figure in order to find cash flows from operating activities. And the increase in A/R meant that $25 of sales occurred on credit and have not yet been paid for in cash.

In the case of finding Cash Flows when there is a change in a fixed asset account, say the Buildings and Equipment account decreases, the change is added back to Net Income. The reasoning behind this is that because Net Income is calculated by, Net Income = Rev - Cogs - Depreciation Exp - Other Exp then the Net Income figure will be decreased by the building's depreciation that year. This depreciation is not associated with an exchange of cash, therefore the depreciation is added back into net income to remove the non-cash activity.

Rules (financing activities)
Finding the Cash Flows from Financing Activities is much more intuitive and needs little explanation. Generally, the things to account for are financing activities:
Include as outflows, reductions of long term notes payable (as would represent the cash repayment of debt on the balance sheet)
Or as inflows, the issuance of new notes payable
Include as outflows, all dividends paid by the entity to outside parties
Or as inflows, dividend payments received from outside parties
Include as outflows, the purchase of notes stocks or bonds
Or as inflows, the receipt of payments on such financing vehicles.
In the case of more advanced accounting situations, such as when dealing with subsidiaries, the accountant must
Exclude intra-company dividend payments.
Exclude intra-company bond interest.
A traditional equation for this might look something like,

Example: cash flow of XYZ:

See also
Cash flow
Income statement
Balance sheet
statement of changes in equity

Notes and references 

Cash flow
Financial statements
Accounting terminology